Mariano Fazio is an Argentine Roman Catholic priest who is the Auxiliary Vicar of the Prelature of Opus Dei (2019 to the present).

He was born on April 25, 1960 in Buenos Aires, Argentina . He was the rector of the Pontifical University of the Holy Cross from 2002 to 2008, and was the  president of the Conference of Rectors of the Pontifical Universities of Rome. He served as the Regional Vicar of Opus Dei in Argentina, Paraguay and Bolivia up to 2014.  In 2007, he worked as an expert at the Latin American Bishops Conference in Aparecida, Brazil.

Education and early work 

He finished History at the University of Buenos Aires. He has a doctorate in Philosophy from the Pontifical University of the Holy Cross.

For seven years he was a professor of Philosophy of Law and was an editorial writer for the Ecuadorean newspaper El Telégrafo.

In 1991, he was ordained a priest by John Paul II.

He is a member of the Chesterton Society in Argentina and the National Academy of History in Ecuador.

Works 

He is the author of more than 20 books on modern society and the process of secularization.

Pope Francis: Keys to His Thought
Historia de la filosofía contemporánea
Historia de la filosofía moderna
Historia de las ideas contemporáneas
Juan XXIII
Beato Pablo VI: Gobernar desde el dolor
De Benedicto XV a Benedicto XVI

References
Monsignor Mariano Fazio ib Opus Dei website

Living people
20th-century Argentine Roman Catholic priests
Opus Dei leaders
Year of birth missing (living people)
Academic staff of the Pontifical University of the Holy Cross
21st-century Argentine Roman Catholic priests